The figbirds are a genus (Sphecotheres) in the family of Old World orioles found in wooded habitats in Australia, New Guinea, and the Lesser Sundas.

Taxonomy and systematics
Formerly, the three species have been considered conspecific, but all major authorities now consider them as separate species. The split is primarily based on differences in measurements, plumage, and biogeography.

Species
Three species are recognized:

Description
They are strongly sexually dimorphic, with males having olive-green upperparts, a black head, and (uniquely for the family) distinct bright red facial skin. Females are drab-coloured, being dull brownish above, and white below with strong dark streaking. They have greyish facial skin, and a greyish-black bill.

Behaviour and ecology
Compared to the "typical" Old World orioles of the genus Oriolus, the figbirds are more frugivorous (though they also take some small insects, nectar, and seeds) and gregarious, even breeding in small, loose colonies (at least for the Australasian figbird; the nesting habits are still unknown for the other two species).

References

 
Birds of New Guinea
Birds of the Lesser Sunda Islands
Taxa named by Louis Jean Pierre Vieillot